The Cowles–Woodruff House, listed on the National Register of Historic Places as the Cowles House and also known as the Woodruff House or the Cowles–Bond House, is owned by Mercer University in Macon, Georgia and is located at 988 Bond Street. It is an antebellum home the overlooks downtown Macon. It was used by General James H. Wilson as his residence and headquarters during the occupation of Macon by the US Army in 1864. From 1960 to 1978 it was the campus of Stratford Academy.

The mansion is named for its first two owners. It was listed on the National Register of Historic Places on June 21, 1971.

It was built in 1836 and is an example of Greek revival architecture. It is used by the University for special events.

See also
National Register of Historic Places listings in Bibb County, Georgia

References

Houses on the National Register of Historic Places in Georgia (U.S. state)
Houses in Macon, Georgia
Houses completed in 1836
Greek Revival houses in Georgia (U.S. state)
Mercer University
National Register of Historic Places in Bibb County, Georgia